Yelena Nikolayevna Shevchenko (born 7 October 1971) is a retired Russian gymnast. She competed at the 1988 Summer Olympics in all artistic gymnastics events and won a gold medal with the Soviet team. Individually her best achievement was ninth place in the vault. 

She was included to the Olympic team owing to her strong performance at national competitions and the 1986 Goodwill Games. She missed the 1987 world championships due to injury. She retired from competitions in 1989 and since then works as a gymnastics coach and referee; in particular, she worked as a judge at the 2001 World Championships. She married speed skater Vladislav Olenin, and in 1999 gave birth to a son during a stay in England.

References 

1971 births
Living people
Gymnasts from Moscow
Soviet female artistic gymnasts
Gymnasts at the 1988 Summer Olympics
Olympic gymnasts of the Soviet Union
Olympic gold medalists for the Soviet Union
Olympic medalists in gymnastics
Honoured Masters of Sport of the USSR
Medalists at the 1988 Summer Olympics